Hunan City University is a university located in Yiyang, Hunan, China.

As of fall 2019, the university has 2 campuses, a combined student body of 18,600 students and 1,108 faculty members.

The university consists of 15 colleges, with 40 specialties for undergraduates.

History
Hunan City University was founded in 1970, it was initially called "Yiyang Normal College".

In November 1976, it was renamed "Hunan Normal College, Yiyang".

In 2002, Hunan City College and Yiyang Normal College merged into Hunan City University.

Academics

 School of Civil Engineering
 School of Architecture and Urban Planning
 School of Municipal and Surveying and Mapping Engineering
 School of City Management
 School of Information Science and Engineering
 School of Arts
 School of Foreign Languages
 School of Communication and Electronic Engineering
 School of Chemistry and Environmental Engineering
 School of Physical
 School of Music
 School of Art and Artistic Designing
 School of Marxism
 School of Business
 School of Mathematics
 School of Computer Science

Library collections
Hunan City University's total collection amounts to more than 1.53 million items.

Culture
 Motto:

References

External links

Universities and colleges in Hunan
Educational institutions established in 1970
Yiyang
1970 establishments in China